John Francis Clauser (born December 1, 1942) is an American theoretical and experimental physicist known for contributions to the foundations of quantum mechanics, in particular the Clauser–Horne–Shimony–Holt inequality. 

Clauser was awarded the 2022 Nobel Prize in Physics, jointly with Alain Aspect and Anton Zeilinger "for experiments with entangled photons, establishing the violation of Bell inequalities and pioneering quantum information science".

Biography 
Clauser was born in Pasadena, California. His father, Francis H. Clauser, was a professor of aeronautical engineering who founded and chaired the aeronautics department at Johns Hopkins University. He later served as the Clark Blanchard Millikan Professor of Engineering at the California Institute of Technology (Caltech). His mother, Catharine McMillan, was the humanities librarian at Caltech and sister of 1951 Nobel Prize in Chemistry laureate Edwin McMillan.

Clauser initially found quantum mechanics to be daunting—the field which would become his life's work—and had to repeat a course in Advanced Quantum Mechanics three times before he passed. He received a bachelor of science in physics from Caltech in 1964, where he was a member of Dabney House.  He received a master of arts in physics in 1966 and a doctor of philosophy in physics in 1969 from Columbia University under the direction of Patrick Thaddeus.

From 1969 to 1975, he worked as a postdoctoral researcher at the University of California, Berkeley and Lawrence Berkeley National Laboratory.  In 1972, working with Berkeley graduate student Stuart Freedman, he carried out the first experimental test of the CHSH-Bell's theorem predictions. This was the first experimental observation of a violation of a Bell inequality. In 1974, working with Michael Horne, he first showed that a generalization of Bell's Theorem provides severe constraints for all local realistic theories of nature (a.k.a. objective local theories). That work introduced the Clauser–Horne (CH) inequality as the first fully general experimental requirement set by local realism. It also introduced the "CH no-enhancement assumption", whereupon the CH inequality reduces to the CHSH inequality, and whereupon associated experimental tests also constrain local realism. Also in 1974 he made the first observation of sub-Poissonian statistics for light (via a violation of the Cauchy–Schwarz inequality for classical electromagnetic fields), and thereby, for the first time, demonstrated an unambiguous particle-like character for photons. 

Clauser worked as a research physicist mainly at Lawrence Livermore and Berkeley from 1975 to 1997. In 1976 he carried out the world's second experimental test of the CHSH-Bell's Theorem predictions.

Clauser was awarded the Wolf Prize in Physics in 2010 together with Alain Aspect and Anton Zeilinger. The three were also jointly awarded the 2022 Nobel Prize in Physics.

See also 
 Epistemological Letters

References

External links 

 
 Oral history interview transcript with John Clauser on 20, 21, and 23 May 2020, American Institute of Physics, Niels Bohr Library & Archives
 John Clauser's homepage

1942 births
People from Pasadena, California
20th-century American physicists
21st-century American physicists
Columbia Graduate School of Arts and Sciences alumni
University of California, Berkeley staff
Wolf Prize in Physics laureates
Living people
Nobel laureates in Physics
American Nobel laureates